Baptist Boys’ High School is a secondary school in Abeokuta, Ogun State, south-west Nigeria. It had a student body of 1,100 students as of the 2011–12 academic year. The student population has decreased by almost half from the peak of 2155 in 1998–1999 academic year, partly in response to a concern about overcrowded facilities. BBHS is on its permanent site, Oke-Saje.

History
Baptist Boys’ High School was founded by the American Southern Baptist Convention, whose Foreign Mission Board started work in Abeokuta on August 5, 1850, with the arrival of the first missionary, Reverend Thomas Jefferson Bowen As well as preaching the gospel, the American Southern Baptist mission to Nigeria provided schools, hospitals, teacher training and theological colleges. The Nigerian Baptist Mission, an arm of its American counterpart, established three primary schools at Ago-Owu, Ago-Ijaye and Oke-saje.

After rapid growth of the Owu school to about 150 students, Reverend Samuel George Pinnock was directed by the Mission to set up a post primary school to educate children from the three feeder primary schools. In 1916 Pinnock identified and chose the site, Egunya Hill, and negotiated the purchase of the land. The building of the school was delayed because of the effect of World War I on the cost of building materials. However, in early 1922 Pinnock oversaw the construction of the Principal's Quarters, which also doubled as Abeokuta Mission House; a block of five classrooms, a chapel, and a dormitory for boys.

In 1922 Pinnock selected a group of advanced students from the three feeder primary schools at Ago-Owu, Ago-Ijaye and Oke-saje, and these formed the first class of the school. He opened Baptist Boys’ High School on January 23, 1923, with 75 students and four teachers (including his wife, Madora Pinnock). The opening ceremony attracted 2000 guests. The guest speaker was Professor Nathaniel Oyerinde, a teacher at the Baptist Academy, Ogbomoso, and Nigeria's first Baptist Professor.

Baptist Boys’ High School was set up as, and still remains, a boys-only school, although it became a mixed school very briefly in 1969 and 1970 following the introduction of the Higher School Certificate by the school board of governors. The school grew to 400 by December 1946, and to 1110 as of 2011–2012 academic year.

The school remained at Egunya Hill until 1969, at which time it was moved to Oke-Saje. Boarding students are accommodated in hostels, but the number of boarding students has declined progressively over time – from 513 in 1998-1999 to 36 in 2011–2012 academic year.

Organisation

Schools: BBHS has two divisions, the Junior Secondary School and the Senior Secondary School, each of three-year duration.
Houses: Students are grouped into four houses appropriately for ‘inter-house’ sports competitions. Bowen House is named after Reverend Thomas Jefferson Bowen, pioneer American Southern Baptist missionary to Nigeria. Pinnock House is named after the founding principal of BBHS, the Reverend Samuel Gorge Pinnock. Agboola House is named after the Reverend Emmanuel Oladele Agboola; he was the chairman of the board of governors of BBHS (1958-1971) and a Baptist preacher. Aloba House was named after a former BBHS teacher.

Alumni Association

BBHS Old Boys Association has branches in the UK/Ireland, USA/Canada, Abeokuta, Ibadan, Ijebu Ode, Lagos and Abuja.

Notable alumni
Obafemi Awolowo
Olusegun Obasanjo
Bola Ajibola
Gbenga Daniel
Moshood Abiola
Dimeji Bankole
Thomas Adeoye Lambo
Adegboyega Dosunmu Amororo II
Oyeleye Oyediran
Olawale Adeniji Ige
Kayode Soyinka
Onaolapo Soleye
Sunday Afolabi
Adedotun Aremu Gbadebo III
Alani Bankole

Photo gallery

References

Further reading

The School History Book 1923–2007, BBHS, Abeokuta, Nigeria.
Tepede, A. (1999) Our Own Time on the Hill, Nulli Secundus, Annual Magazine of the Baptist Boys’ High School Old Boys Association, Volume 1, Number 1, January 1999, p. 27.

External links
https://web.archive.org/web/20130525083421/http://bbhsoba.com/
https://web.archive.org/web/20130301061932/http://bbhsoba.org/

Secondary schools in Ogun State
Schools in Abeokuta
Educational institutions established in 1923
1923 establishments in Nigeria
Baptist schools in Nigeria